Leopoldo Palma (born 13 March 1891, date of death unknown) was a Chilean middle-distance runner. He competed in the men's 800 metres at the 1912 Summer Olympics.

References

1891 births
Year of death missing
Athletes (track and field) at the 1912 Summer Olympics
Chilean male middle-distance runners
Olympic athletes of Chile
Sportspeople from Santiago